Gymnastics at the 2016 Summer Olympics in Rio de Janeiro was held in three categories: artistic gymnastics, rhythmic gymnastics and trampolining. All gymnastics events were staged at the Arena Olímpica do Rio from 6 to 21 August 2016.

Qualification

Qualification was based on the results of the 2015 World Artistic Gymnastics Championships, held in Glasgow, Scotland, from 24 October to 1 November 2015; the 2015 World Rhythmic Gymnastics Championships, held in Stuttgart, Germany, from 7 to 13 September 2015; the 2015 Trampoline World Championships, held in Odense, Denmark, from 25 to 28 November 2015; and the Olympic Test Event, held on 16–22 April 2016 at Arena Olímpica do Rio.

Schedule

Participation

Participating nations
Brazil, as the host country, receives a guaranteed spot, in case it were not to earn one by the regular qualifying methods.

Participating gymnasts

Medal table

Events

Artistic gymnastics

Men's events

Women's events
For the first time since the 1972 Olympics, Romania did not win a medal in the women's team event, due to Romania's failure to qualify a team for the first time since 1968, ending a 40-year medal run.

Rhythmic gymnastics

Trampoline

Gala 
For the first time since 2008, a gala was held in gymnastics; it was held on 17 August 2016, following the completion of competition in the artistic disciplines. The exhibition event featured performances by artistic gymnasts who participated in Rio.

References

External links
 
 
 
 Results Book – Gymnastic Artistic. library.olympic.org.
 Results Book – Gymnastic Rhythmic. library.olympic.org.
 Results Book – Gymnastic Trampoline. library.olympic.org.
 Artistic Gymnastics at the 2016 Summer Olympics at Olympedia
 Rhythmic Gymnastics at the 2016 Summer Olympics at Olympedia
 Trampolining at the 2016 Summer Olympics at Olympedia
 Fédération Internationale de Gymnastique

 
2016 Summer Olympics events
Olympics
2016
Gymnastics competitions in Brazil
International gymnastics competitions hosted by Brazil